Ganja often refers to cannabis.

Ganja may also refer to:

People
 Ganja Karuppu
 Laganja Estranja
 Alexander Ganja (Oleksandr Hanzha), one of the Dnepropetrovsk maniacs

Places

Azerbaijan
Ganja, Azerbaijan, a city in Azerbaijan
Gəncə, Goygol, a village in Azerbaijan

Iran
Ganzak, an ancient city in Iran
 Ganja (Lorestan Province, Iran)
 Ganja (Gilan Province, Iran)
 Ganja (Hamedan Province, Iran)
 Ganja (Isfahan Province, Iran)
 Ganja (Ilam Province, Iran)

Other uses
"Ganja Bus", a 2004 song by Cypress Hill
Ghanjah, a large wooden trading dhow
"Must Be the Ganja", a 2009 song by rapper Eminem
"Ganja Burn", a 2018 song by Nicki Minaj
1139 Ganja earthquake, natural disaster affecting Azerbaijan

See also
Gunja (disambiguation)